Mackeys is an unincorporated community in Dunklin County, in the U.S. state of Missouri.

The community derives its name from Virgil McKay, original owner of the site.

References

Unincorporated communities in Dunklin County, Missouri
Unincorporated communities in Missouri